Harkirat Singh is an Indian name. Notable people called Harkirat Singh includes

 Harkirat Singh Kalsi, Indian cyclist
 Harkirat Singh (general), retired Indian Army officer and one of the Commanding officers of the erstwhile Indian Peace Keeping Force in Sri Lanka